The Chronicles of Riddick: Dark Fury is a 2004 American adult animated science fiction short film, directed by Korean-American animator Peter Chung, and featuring Vin Diesel reprising his role as Richard B. Riddick. It acts as a bridgepoint between Pitch Black and The Chronicles of Riddick and explains why Riddick decides to go into hiding and deliver Jack and Imam Abu al-Walid to New Mecca.

Plot
Shortly after escaping from the dark planet, Riddick, Jack, and the Imam are picked up by Kublai Khan, a private mercenary vessel. Although Riddick attempts to conceal his identity from the mercenaries by impersonating his former captor William J. Johns over the ship's radio, they quickly voice-print and identify him. The vessel's captain, Junner, assembles a crew of mercs to retrieve Riddick, who manages to get the drop on them by activating his ship's fire suppression system and using the foam as cover. After easily killing most of the mercs, Riddick surrenders when Jack is captured and held at gunpoint by Junner.

The trio of survivors discover that their captors have unusual plans for them. They are introduced to Antonia Chillingsworth (Tress MacNeille), who collects notorious criminals and keeps them in a state of suspended animation where they are still alive but are unable to speak or move. She explains that, in her view, this is both a fitting punishment and a way for said killers to be honored for what they are. She intends to do the same to Riddick, but first, she forces him to fight for Jack and Iman's lives by putting them in an arena with two "Shrills", bio-luminescent creatures that resemble parasitic jellyfish.

Riddick kills both creatures and uses his knife to extract an explosive planted in his neck by Junner to keep him in line; realizing his plan, Chillingsworth detonates the explosive, creating an exit for the trio to escape through. She angrily orders Junner to wake up more mercenaries, including a cunning merc by the name of Toombs, and also releases a dangerous carnivorous alien to hunt them. Riddick has Iman take Jack up to the flight deck and uses his own blood to trick the alien into slaughtering the pursuing mercs (except for Toombs, who manages to hide in a pipe). He then surprises and kills the alien.
  
Junner, anticipating Riddick's plan, knocks out Iman and tries to strangle Jack before Riddick confronts him. The two men are evenly matched until Riddick maneuvers Junner into severing a power cable with his sword, putting out the lights and giving Riddick an opening to stab Junner in the eye. A deranged Chillingsworth then appears and is about to kill Riddick when Jack picks up Junner's rifle and shoots her in the head. As the trio departs on a dropship, Imam expresses concern that Jack will become exactly like Riddick if they continue to travel together. Agreeing, Riddick decides to leave them at New Mecca while he goes into hiding. Meanwhile, Toombs, having assumed command of Kublai Khan, sets off to capture Riddick for his bounty.

Voice cast
 Vin Diesel as Richard B. Riddick
 Rhiana Griffith as Jack
 Keith David as Imam Abu al-Walid
 Tress MacNeille as Antonia Chillingsworth
 Roger L. Jackson as Junner
 Nick Chinlund as Toombs
 Dwight Schultz as Skiff A.I.
 Sarge as Escort Merc
 Julia Fletcher as Merc Squad Leader
 Hedy Burress as Lab Tech
 Andrew Philpot as Tech
 Rick Gomez as Lead Merc

References

External links
 
 
 

2000s animated short films
American science fiction action films
Direct-to-video interquel films
Universal Pictures direct-to-video animated films
2004 science fiction action films
2004 films
The Chronicles of Riddick (franchise)
2000s American animated films
2004 animated films
Adult animated science fiction films
American adult animated films
American animated short films
American animated science fiction films
Universal Pictures direct-to-video films
Films directed by Peter Chung
2000s English-language films